Guy Povey (born 25 May 1960, in Birmingham) is a British auto racing driver. He presently drives a BMW M3 E36 in Production Saloons series for his own Povey Motorsport Team. He has also drove in the Britcar 24 Hour race. His previous racing includes motocross and the Uniroyal production saloon championship. Povey won back to back class titles in the BARC/Firestone prodsaloon championship in 1990 and 1991. He entered one round of the 1992 British Touring Car Championship in a BMW M3 for the Techspeed Racing team. Povey returned to Britcar in 2018 with Dave Cox in a BMW for the 2018 finale at Britcar's infamous 'Into the Night' race.

Racing record

Complete British Touring Car Championship results
(key) Races in bold indicate pole position (1982-1984 in class) Races in italics indicate fastest lap.

Complete 24 Hours of Spa results

Complete 24 Hours of Silverstone results

Complete Britcar results
(key) (Races in bold indicate pole position in class – 1 point awarded just in first race; races in italics indicate fastest lap in class – 1 point awarded all races;-

External links
 

British Touring Car Championship drivers
Britcar 24-hour drivers
24 Hours of Spa drivers
Nürburgring 24 Hours drivers
1960 births
English racing drivers
Living people
Britcar drivers
24H Series drivers